Cliff Thomas is a British railway author and journalist, particularly known for his works on narrow-gauge railways.

Biography 
Thomas was a writer and editor of Railway World magazine. He has been a writer on the subjects of steam locomotives and heritage railways for The Railway Magazine since 2007. Thomas is Chairman of the Greensand Railway Museum Trust, a charity that restores historic rolling stock related to the sand quarrying industry. He is also a Director of the Leighton Buzzard Light Railway.

In 2016, Thomas sued writer and illustrator Pauline Hazelwood over a children's book about the steam locomotive "Alice". The case was settled before trial with the payment of a financial sum to Mr Thomas.

Works

References 

English non-fiction writers
Rail transport writers
English male non-fiction writers
British journalists